Aksenovo is a rural locality (a village) in Gorod Vyazniki, Vyaznikovsky District, Vladimir Oblast, Russia. The population was 6 as of 2010.

Geography 
Aksenovo is located near the Klyazma River, 18 km southeast of Vyazniki (the district's administrative centre) by road. Perovo is the nearest rural locality.

References 

Rural localities in Vyaznikovsky District